"In like Flynn" is a slang phrase meaning "having quickly or easily achieved a goal or gained access as desired".

Origins
Barry Popik of the American Dialect Society and Nattalie Grebenshikoff of the Gold Coast Literary Society found an example from 1940, as well as this from the sports section of the San Francisco Examiner of 8 February 1942: “Answer these questions correctly and your name is Flynn, meaning you’re in, provided you have two left feet and the written consent of your parents”. To judge from a newspaper reference he turned up from early 1943, the phrase could by then also be shortened to I'm Flynn, meaning “I’m in”.

In later years, the rhyming phrase became associated with actor Errol Flynn, who had a reputation for womanizing, consumption of alcohol, and brawling. In November 1942, two under-age girls, Betty Hansen and Peggy Satterlee, accused him of statutory rape. A group was organized to support Flynn, named the American Boys' Club for the Defense of Errol Flynn (ABCDEF); its members included William F. Buckley Jr. The trial took place in January and February 1943, and Flynn was acquitted of the charges. According to etymologist Michael Quinion, the incident served to increase Flynn's reputation as a ladies' man, which influenced the connotations of the phrase "in like Flynn". Many early sources, attesting the phrase, say it emerged as war slang during World War II.

In addition to the Errol Flynn association, etymologist Eric Partridge presents evidence that it refers to Edward J. Flynn, a New York City political boss who became a campaign manager for the Democratic party during Franklin Delano Roosevelt's presidency. Boss Flynn's "Democratic Party machine exercised absolute political control over the Bronx.... The candidates he backed were almost automatically 'in'."

In Australia, the 1932 Ion Idriess biographical novel Flynn of the Inland about John Flynn & the Royal Flying Doctor Service, may add to the list of possible associations with the expression.

Quinion also notes that the title of the 1967 film In Like Flint is a play on the term, and that has led to a malapropism where some speakers believe that is the original phrase.

References

Further reading

English phrases
Catchphrases
1940s neologisms
Australian English
Cultural depictions of Errol Flynn